Len Crone (2 January 1903 – 18 February 1958) was an Australian rules footballer who played with Carlton in the Victorian Football League (VFL).

Notes

External links 

Len Crone's profile at Blueseum

1903 births
Carlton Football Club players
Australian rules footballers from Victoria (Australia)
1958 deaths